Topogon is a wide field (originally 100 degrees field of view), symmetrical photographic lens designed by Robert Richter in 1933 for Zeiss Carl FA. Lenses produced under the name Metrogon also cite the US patent of the Topogon design. The initial design patented by Richter was for a f=66mm 6.3 lens, although the patent also contains two other refinements to the basic design, including one that used parallel elements to minimize vignetting.

Topogon lenses have been produced with maximum apertures ranging from f/3.5 to f/15 in various focal lengths. According to Richter, the Topogon was developed from the earlier Hypergon. Although the Hypergon covered a wide angle of view (140°) and had good flatness of field and distortion characteristics, the maximum aperture was limited to 22 to control longitudinal spherical aberration and chromatic aberration. A new computation of a "fast" Hypergon was made by limiting the angle of view to 90°, increasing maximum aperture to 6.3. The Topogon was then derived from the "fast" Hypergon by adding a second set of strongly curved meniscus elements inboard of the larger spherical elements to correct longitudinal spherical aberration.

The Topogon was later developed into the Pleogon lens by Richter and Friedrich Koch in 1956. The Pleogon, used for photogrammetry, used a cemented achromatic lens just ahead of the central stop and added two meniscus groups on either side to maintain lens symmetry.

References

External links 
HYPERGON - TOPOGON - RUSSAR - BIOGON - AVIOGON - HOLOGON: LA STORIA DEFINITIVA DEI SUPER-GRANDANGOLARI SIMMETRICI

Photographic lenses
Zeiss lenses